Events from the year 1627 in France

Incumbents
 Monarch – Louis XIII

Events
Anglo-French War (1627–1629)
Siege of Saint-Martin-de-Ré
Siege of La Rochelle

Births

27 September – Jacques-Bénigne Bossuet, bishop (died 1704)

Full date missing
Hector d'Andigné de Grandfontaine, governor (died 1696)

Deaths

Full date missing
Jacques Mauduit, composer (born 1557)
François Savary de Brèves, ambassador and orientalist (born 1560)
Charles Loyseau, lawyer (born 1564)
Marie Vernier, actress (born c.1590)
Marie de Bourbon, Duchess of Montpensier, noblewoman (born 1605)

See also

References

1620s in France